Hubig's Pies, also sometimes called Hubig's New Orleans Style Pies, are a brand of fruit and sweet-filled fried pies that were produced by the Simon Hubig Pie Company in New Orleans, Louisiana. The product was off the market from 2012 after a fire completely destroyed the factory, but the business was brought back in 2022.

History

Simon Hubig was born in Spain's Basque Country and immigrated to the United States after serving in World War I. He founded the Simon Hubig Pie Company in Fort Worth, Texas in 1922, capitalizing on baking skills he learned at his mother's bakery. In subsequent years, the company expanded to nine locations throughout the Southeastern United States and opened its New Orleans location in 1922.

During the Great Depression, all of the locations were forced to close except the New Orleans bakery, which remained profitable. Throughout the life of the company, the New Orleans bakery stayed in the same Dauphine Street location in the Faubourg Marigny it was founded in.

Operations

The production process changed very little over time. Before Hurricane Katrina, in addition to the famous turnover-style pie, Hubig's also made individual and family-sized pies.  Hubig's Pies frequently donated fresh products to charitable organizations in the area. The Orleans Parish jail was traditionally one of the largest buyers of pies. Until the end, the Hubig's bakery remained heavily reliant on laborers rather than automated processes.

Savory Simon
Savory Simon is the mascot of Hubig's Pies, and he was prominently featured on the packaging and some advertising for their pies.

Hurricane Katrina aftermath
When the city of New Orleans was struck by Hurricane Katrina in August 2005, the bakery's ventilation system, an exterior wall, and the roof were damaged. Production of Hubig's pies was halted and did not start again until more than four months later, January 4, 2006, after the neighborhood had clean water, reliable electricity, and sufficient gas pressure. Hubig's pies increased slightly in cost after the storm, and the variety of flavors offered changed. About 30,000 hand-sized pies were made a day to be delivered on the next day.

Fire and failed re-opening efforts 

On July 27, 2012, a fire broke out at the bakery. Flames were seen coming from the front of the building at about 4:30 a.m. The fire grew to five alarms, engulfing the factory. A little more than an hour after the first firefighters arrived, the facade of the building crumbled. No one was hurt, but the facility was a total loss. Co-owner Andrew Ramsey originally said he planned to rebuild and resume production as soon as possible, and in 2013, the city approved plans by Hubig's to build a factory in a new location. The efforts eventually stalled, however, before any construction work had started. In 2014, Ramsey stated that he could not "give [...] even a tentative date" for a return of Hubig's, because the company's owners were "not in concert about how to proceed". He added that while he himself would favor a re-opening, he had "no control over whether that happen[ed]." As of summer 2015, there has been no construction work on a new factory, the company's web site is unreachable, and its official Facebook page has not been updated for more than two years.

In April 2015, the New Orleans City Planning Commission approved plans to construct residential buildings on the site of the former Hubig's Pies factory.

Long promised return

On July 18, 2019, it was announced that production would resume in 2020 from a plant in Jefferson Parish.  The company was expected to resume production in 2020. 

In November 2022, the company announced it was hiring, suggesting that a return may be in the works. They officially returned later in the month.

References

External links

Official Hubig's Pies Website
Times-Picayune article on Hubig's history
An article on Hubig's struggle to reopen after Katrina.
New York Times article on the return of Hubig's Pies.
An audio interview with Andrew Ramsey after Hurricane Katrina, which describes the process of making Hubig's pies.
A personal testimonial by Andrew Ramsey on the problems facing Hubig's after Katrina.
Article citing Hubig's pies as a prop in New Orleans-based television show Treme.
A video report by WDSU News on the fire that destroyed the Hubig's facility.

Manufacturing companies based in New Orleans
American brands
Food and drink companies of New Orleans